Voineşti may refer to several places in Romania:

 Voinești, Dâmbovița, a commune in Dâmboviţa County
 Voinești, Iași, a commune in Iași County
 Voinești, Vaslui, a commune in Vaslui County
 Voinești, a village in Lerești Commune, Argeș County
 Voinești, a village in Măxineni Commune, Brăila County
 Voinești, a village in Vulturești Commune, Vaslui County
 Voinești (river), a tributary of the Bahlui in Iași County

See also 
 Voina (disambiguation)
 Voicu, a surname
 Voinea, a surname
 Voineasa (disambiguation)